Alma Media Oyj  is a Finnish media and digital service business company.

In addition to news services, the company's products provide information related to lifestyle, career and business development. The services of Alma Media have expanded from Finland to the Nordic countries, the Baltics and Central Europe. Alma Media employs approximately 1,800 people. The group's revenue in 2019 totalled approximately EUR 250.2 million.

Business segments
Alma Media's business units are Alma Markets,  and Alma Consumer.

Alma Markets
Alma Markets segment includes several online services. The services are related to sectors such as housing (Vuokraovi.com, NettiKoti, Kivi and Urakkamaailma), recruitment (Jobs.cz, Prace.cz, CV Online, Profesia.sk, MojPosao.net, and Monster.cz) as well as mobility (Autotalli.com and ).

Alma Talent
 publishes trade and financial magazines and newspapers, as well as a variety of books. The business unit will also offer skills development and growth services to professionals and businesses in different fields, from events and training to information services.

In Sweden, publications by Alma Talent include Ny Teknik.

Alma Consumer
Alma Consumer publishes the national news media Iltalehti, regional newspapers Aamulehti, Satakunnan Kansa, and the local and town papers published in Pirkanmaa as well in western and central Finland. The offering of the business segment also includes several digital consumer services related to lifestyle, travel, cooking and dating. The printing unit Alma Manu is also part of the business segment.

History in brief
 Suomalaisen Kirjallisuuden Seuran Kirjapainon Osakeyhtiö (Finnish Literature Society's Printing Company Ltd) starts operating in 1849 and prints the Suometar newspaper.
 Alma's biggest newspapers are founded around the century: Satakunnan Kansa (1873), Aamulehti (1881), Kauppalehti (1898), Pohjolan Sanomat  (1915), Kainuun Sanomat (1917) and Lapin Kansa (1928). Iltalehti was founded in 1980.
 Tampereen Kirjapaino Oy and Uusi Suomi Oy are merged in 1988 to become one of Finland's largest newspaper publishers. The new company was later named Aamulehti Corporation.
 Over the years, the company expands its business from newspapers to online services, television and radio. 
 Alma Media Corporation officially begins operating in 1998. 
 A major restructuring took place in Alma Media in 2005. The company divested its broadcasting business and decided to focus on publishing newspapers, business information and online marketplaces.
 In December 2011 Alma acquired LMC s.r.o. Czech leading provider of Jobs.cz, Prace.cz jobboards and LMC G2 e-recruitment solution.

References

External links
 

Companies based in Helsinki
Companies listed on Nasdaq Helsinki
Mass media companies of Finland
Mass media in Helsinki
Newspaper companies